Cazador ( m., m-pl. cazadores, f. cazadora, f-pl. cazadoras), El Cazador, La Cazadora, Los Cazadores, Las Cazadoras, or variation, may refer to:

Places
 Cazador, San Luis, Argentina
 El Cazadore Museum, Grand Bay, Alabama, USA

People
 Cazador (infantry)
 An alternate spelling of Caçadore

Persons
 Juan Cazador (1899–1956), a Spanish poet and part of the Generation of '27
 Diana La Cazadora (born 1978), Mexican wrestler
 Joey "El Cazador" Ruquet (21st century), a MMA fighter on the Combate Global circuit; see List of current Combate Global fighters
 Juan el Cazador (14th century), a famed resident of Mequinenza, Zaragoza, Aragon, Spain
 John I of Aragon (1350–1396), King of Aragon, nicknamed "El Cazador"
 Charles IV of Spain (1748–1819) King of Spain, nicknamed "El Cazador" due to his love of hunting
 Beatriz de Bobadilla y Ossorio (1462–1501), a monarch in the Canary Islands, nicknamed "La Cazadora" for headhunting men of high nobility

Fictional characters
 Diana la Cazadora, the titular character from the 1915 play Diana Cazadora by the Quintero brothers

Arts and entertainment
 El Cazador (film), 2020 film by Argentine director Marco Berger
 Los Cazadores (play), a 1967 play by Paco Ignacio Taibo I
 El Cazador (exhibition), a photographic exhibition of Alvaro Laiz works at the Fundación Cerezales Antonino y Cinia

Literature
 Cazador (comics) an Argentine Spanish-language comic book
 El Cazador (comics), a short-lived U.S. English-language comic book series
 El Cazador (novel; aka El Cazador de Leones), a 1967 Spanish-language novella by Javier Tomeo
 El Cazador (story), a 1999 Spanish-language short story by Clara Obligado
 El Cazador (story), a 2000 English-language horror short story by Lisa Morton

Music

Albums
 Los Cazadores: Primera Busqueda (album), a 2005 reggaeton compilation album
 El Cazador (album), a 1999 album by Bobby Pulido

Songs
 "El Cazador" (song), a 2019 song by Natanael Cano off the album Corridos Tumbados
 "Cazadora" (song), a 2014 song by Alexis & Fido off the album La Esencia
 "La Cazadora" (song), a 2005 song by Tito El Bambino from the album Los Cazadores: Primera Busqueda; see Tito El Bambino discography
 "Cazadora" (song), a 2005 song by Calle Ciega off the album Una Vez Más (Calle Ciega album)

Television
 El Cazador de la Bruja (TV series; aka El Cazador), an anime television series
 El Cazador (TV game show), the Spanish adaptation of the television show The Chase
 "El Cazador" (episode), a 2019 TV episode of Decisiones: Unos ganan, otros pierden

Ships
 , whose sinking in 1856 caused the biggest single-incident maritime losses of life in the history of Chile
 , a 1784 Spanish shipwreck
 Cazadora (1981), a  commissioned into the Spanish Navy in 1981, and has used pennant numbers F35 and P78
 La Cazadora (1779), a corvette built at Ferro; see List of ships built at Ferrol shipyards 1750–1881

Fictional ships
 El Cazadora, a fictional playing ship from the game Pirates Constructible Strategy Game

Other uses
 Brigada Acorazada Nº 2 "Cazadores", an army brigade of Chile; see Structure of the Chilean Army
 "Cazadores", a brand of tequila from Bacardi

See also

 
 
 
 
 
 
 Hunter (disambiguation)
 Huntress (disambiguation)
 Huntsman (disambiguation)